Stanisław Kostka was the name of several Polish nobles:

 Stanislaus Kostka (1550–1568), Polish saint
 Stanisław Kostka (1475–1555), Polish castellan and voivode